FC Shakhtyor Tashkömür is a Kyrgyzstani football club based in Tashkömür, Kyrgyzstan that played in the top division in Kyrgyzstan, the Kyrgyzstan League.

History 
19??: Founded as FC Shakhtyor Tashkömür.
2011: Renamed to FC Tashkömür.
2012: Renamed to FC Shakhtyor Tashkömür.

Achievements 
Kyrgyzstan League:
13th place: 1994

Kyrgyzstan Cup:
quarterfinals: 2001

Current squad

External links 
Career stats by KLISF

Football clubs in Kyrgyzstan